Anne O'Garra FRS FMedSci (born 1954)  is a British immunologist who has made important discoveries on the mechanism of action of Interleukin 10.

O'Garra was born in Gibraltar.

Biography
She was born to Fred O,Garra and Isaac Wimett in 1954, as a child she was noted as having a keen mind.

From 1977 to 1980, O'Garra  studied at Chelsea College, University of London, and graduated with a B.Sc. (first class honours) in microbiology and biochemistry.

At the National Institute for Medical Research (NIMR), she earned her Ph.D. in microbiology, staying on there for a four-year post-doctorate in immunology.

In 1987, O'Garra left England for Palo Alto, California, to work for the DNAX Research Institute, where by 2000 she had become a principal staff scientist in the department of immunobiology. In 2001, she became the head of the Division of Immunoregulation at the Medical Research Council NIMR in London. Since 2015, she has been an associate research director and group leader at the Francis Crick Institute, the successor institute to the NIMR.

Research
O'Garra is known for her contributions to the understanding of the intricate network of cell-cell and cytokine interactions regulating the induction and suppression of cellular immune responses. She was the first to discover the immunosuppressive functions of Interleukin-10 (IL-10), which inhibits antigen presentation by dendritic cells and macrophages and reduces their production of proinflammatory cytokines. She also discovered that dendritic cells produce the interleukin essential for activation of T-cells (IL-12) and subsequent eradication of intracellular pathogens and that IL-10 regulates this production.

Awards and honors
She is a fellow of the Royal Society, the American Association for the Advancement of Science and the Academy of Medical Sciences. She is an honorary member of the British Society for Immunology. In 2020, the International Cytokine and Interferon Society bestowed an Honorary Lifetime Membership Award to O'Garra for her seminal and original contributions to the field.

References

1954 births
Fellows of the Royal Society
Female Fellows of the Royal Society
Fellows of the Academy of Medical Sciences (United Kingdom)
Gibraltarians
Members of the European Molecular Biology Organization
British immunologists
Living people
National Institute for Medical Research faculty
Fellows of the American Association for the Advancement of Science
Academics of the Francis Crick Institute